Christopher Knowles (born 1959) is an American poet and painter. He was born in New York City on May 4, 1959, and has received a diagnosis of possible brain damage. He is often referred to as autistic. In 1976, his poetry was used by Robert Wilson for the avant-garde minimalist Philip Glass opera, Einstein on the Beach. Wilson describes his discovery of the then 13-year-old Knowles in the extended notes to the Tomato Records release of Einstein on the Beach:
Wilson cast the teenager Knowles in a number of his productions, including Einstein on the Beach.

In 1978, the American poet John Ashbery wrote in the magazine New York of a volume of Knowles's poetry:

Early in 2013, Knowles presented several of his poems in a reading at Gavin Brown's Enterprise in the West Village which had mounted an exhibition of his paintings. The same year, the Museum of Modern Art acquired several of Knowles' paintings, or rather "typings" or "typed designs" – pictures created with a typewriter and using colored ink to make patterns from letters and numbers. He starts the pictures with his signature and works his way up and to the left, Knowles said, painting all the reds, then all the blues, and so on, his father, Edward, added. One of his pictures consists only of the words "John Simon pollute your anger", inspired by the art critic's dismissive treatment of Robert Wilson (Simon had described Wilson as a charlatan and accused him of exploiting Knowles).

In 2015 Institute of Contemporary Art, Philadelphia, staged "Christopher Knowles: In A Word", a solo exhibition of work spanning Knowles' career. The exhibition traveled to the Contemporary Arts Museum Houston in 2017.

Collections
 NoguerasBlanchard, Madrid / Barcelona, SP
 Brooklyn Museum of Art, Brooklyn, USA
 Fogg Museum, Cambridge, USA
 Museum Boymans-van Beuningen, Rotterdam, NL
 Museum Ludwig (Dr. Peter Ludwig), Cologne, DE
 Museum of Modern Art, New York, US

References

Further reading
 

1959 births
Living people
20th-century American male writers
20th-century American poets
American male poets
Writers from New York City
American people with disabilities
Artists with autism